Salusbury or Salesbury   may refer to:

 Salesbury, a village in Lancashire, England

Surname (many people up to the 18th century are named with both spellings — Salusbury or Salesbury — in different sources)
 Salusbury family, a prominent Anglo-Welsh family
 George Salusbury, MP for Denbigh Boroughs in 1545
 John Salusbury (disambiguation)
 Robert Salesbury (1567–99), MP variously for Denbighshire and Merioneth
 Theodora Salusbury (1875-1956) English stained glass artist
 Thomas Salusbury (disambiguation)
 William Salusbury (disambiguation)

Given name
 Salusbury Mellor (1863–1917), represented Great Britain in the 10- to 20-ton yacht competition at the 1900 Olympics
 Salusbury Pryce Humphreys (1778–1845), Royal Navy officer

See also
 Salisbury (disambiguation)
 Salusbury-Trelawny baronets